William Andrew John Aucamp (16 February 1932 – 22 March 1992) was a South African water polo player. He competed at the 1952 Summer Olympics and the 1960 Summer Olympics.

See also
 List of men's Olympic water polo tournament goalkeepers

References

External links
 

1932 births
1992 deaths
Sportspeople from Johannesburg
South African male water polo players
Water polo goalkeepers
Olympic water polo players of South Africa
Water polo players at the 1952 Summer Olympics
Water polo players at the 1960 Summer Olympics